Courier Newsroom is a digital media company that operates news outlets and sponsors political content intended to support Democratic candidates. The goal of Courier Newsroom publications, according to an internal memo obtained by Vice News, "is to create shareable viral pseudo 'news content' to boost its preferred candidates." The Chief Editor is Lindsay Schrupp. Courier's founder is Tara McGowan, who used to work for the Obama campaign and for the SuperPAC Priorities USA.

History
Courier Newsroom was founded in 2019 by Tara McGowan. As of May 2020, Courier Newsroom websites had a budget of $11 million, a staff of 60 reporters and 12 editors, and aimed to publish approximately 300 articles and videos a week. Courier Newsroom raised $15 million in the first half of 2022 from donors including Reid Hoffman and George Soros. The outlet spent over $5 million on Facebook and Instagram advertising designed to promote Democratic candidates and members of Congress. Mark Zuckerberg's concern that the Courier Newsroom was not a real news outlet sparked a 2020 change in policy at Facebook. Facebook now limits the reach of partisan sites by restricting their access and curtailing their advertising. The Courier Newsroom was originally owned by liberal dark money group ACRONYM, but ACRONYM later divested its stake in the company in April 2021. 

The Courier Newsroom owns local digital newspapers in eight battleground states.

In June 2021, the company acquired a progressive political news site, Iowa Starting Line, which the New York Times called "the best political journalism you've never heard of."  Starting Line's founder, Pat Rynard, announced that as a member of Courier Newsroom's network, the outlet would update its mission to "combat disinformation."

Strategy 
The Courier Newsroom's local digital new outlets are not traditional town newspapers. Instead, these are designed to encourage people in key swing states to vote Democratic, while looking like local newspapers. The articles are promoted on social media such as Facebook, which does not prohibit the practice because the newspapers are for-profit. Its articles trended on Election Day.

Funders include George Soros, Reid Hoffman, and movie producers.

In 2020, the Hopewell Fund financed Courier Newsroom. The New York Times reported that Courier "published articles favoring Democrats and received millions of dollars from dark money groups. It was paid $2.6 million by a nonprofit linked to House Democratic leadership to promote articles."

Newspapers 

 Iowa Starting Line, Iowa, acquired June 2021. Managing Editor: Pat Rynard
Copper Courier, Arizona, launched October 2019. Managing Editor: Brandy Rae Ramirez.
 The Dogwood, launched mid-2019. Motto: "Your source for Virginia news". Managing Editor: Meghan McCarthy. At launch, The Dogwood was owned by an ACRONYM subsidiary, For What Is Worth Media, Inc.
 Up North News, Wisconsin.  It defines itself as "a for-profit media company with progressive non-profit ownership."  Managing Editor: Pat Kreitlow.
 The 'Gander, Michigan.  It defines itself as "a new local news site for Michigan." Managing Editor: Jessica Strachan.
 Cardinal & Pine, North Carolina. It defines itself as "a new local news site for North Carolina."
 The Keystone, Pennsylvania. Its launch had been announced in 2019, though it only debuted in 2020.
 The Americano, nationwide, for Latin Americans. Published in English, it has collaborators in Puerto Rico, Miami, and New York City. Cristy Marrero is the Editor-in-Chief

Criticism 
Courier Newsroom was originally owned by ACRONYM; the creation and operation of Courier Newsroom initially raised outrage and ethics questions about ACRONYM and about its financiers, who include billionaires Reid Hoffman and Laurene Powell Jobs. 

Carrie Brown, director of social journalism at the journalism school at City University of New York, found the targeting of news to swing voters "problematic." Gabby Deutch, writing on behalf of NewsGuard, called Courier News a "faux news site" and said while "[u]nlike some sources of partisan disinformation, Courier stories are generally fact-based" its strategy is nevertheless "pumping up moderate Democrats elected to Congress in 2018 in Republican-leaning districts." NewsGuard rated the Courier websites as "generally unreliable." Vox reported that "the Courier Newsroom launch did raise some eyebrows. If this were a Republican operative declaring its strategy like this, a lot of Democrats probably would have criticized it."

According to The Wall Street Journal, outlets like Courier try to capitalize on readers' trust in local news sources "while playing down their partisan interests and often obscuring their donors." NewsGuard, which rates news sources, warns readers that Courier Newsroom websites are "insufficiently transparent" and "cherry-pick facts to advance a Democratic narrative." According to OpenSecrets, "websites affiliated with Courier Newsroom that appear to be free-standing local news outlets are actually part of a coordinated effort with deep ties to Democratic political operatives."

The Columbia Journalism Review (CJR) described Courier's business model as "money from interested parties who seek a particular political outcome." CJR also reported that Courier engages in political microtargeting wherein "employees at Courier's headquarters are responsible for testing whether content produced by its local newsrooms is successful in moving voters in a desired progressive direction."

Courier Newsroom has been accused of producing pink-slime journalism.

Notes

References

External links 
 
 Courier Newsroom profile factsheet via NewsGuard

American news websites
Mass media companies based in Washington, D.C.
Progressive organizations in the United States
Internet properties established in 2019